Kyparissi, before 1927 known as Bishovo (Μπίσοβο), is a village and a community of the Grevena municipality. Before the 2011 local government reform it was a part of the municipality of Kosmas o Aitolos, of which it was a municipal district. The 2011 census recorded 43 residents in the village. The community of Kyparissi covers an area of 8.372 km2.

See also
 List of settlements in the Grevena regional unit

References

Populated places in Grevena (regional unit)